The meridian 14° east of Greenwich is a line of longitude that extends from the North Pole across the Arctic Ocean, Europe, Africa, the Atlantic Ocean, the Southern Ocean, and Antarctica to the South Pole.

The 14th meridian east forms a great circle with the 166th meridian west.

From Pole to Pole
Starting at the North Pole and heading south to the South Pole, the 14th meridian east passes through:

{| class="wikitable plainrowheaders"
! scope="col" width="125" | Co-ordinates
! scope="col" | Country, territory or sea
! scope="col" | Notes
|-
| style="background:#b0e0e6;" | 
! scope="row" style="background:#b0e0e6;" | Arctic Ocean
| style="background:#b0e0e6;" |
|-
| 
! scope="row" | 
| Island of Spitsbergen, Svalbard
|-
| style="background:#b0e0e6;" | 
! scope="row" style="background:#b0e0e6;" | Atlantic Ocean
| style="background:#b0e0e6;" | Norwegian Sea
|-
| 
! scope="row" | 
| Island of Vestvågøy
|-
| style="background:#b0e0e6;" | 
! scope="row" style="background:#b0e0e6;" | Atlantic Ocean
| style="background:#b0e0e6;" | Norwegian Sea
|-
| 
! scope="row" | 
| Nordland, Røyrvik
|-
| 
! scope="row" | 
| Frostviken
|-
| 
! scope="row" | 
| Lierne
|-
| 
! scope="row" | 
| Jämtland, Dalarna, Värmland, Lake Vänern, Västra Götaland, Jönköping, Kronoberg, Skåne
|-
| style="background:#b0e0e6;" | 
! scope="row" style="background:#b0e0e6;" | Baltic Sea
| style="background:#b0e0e6;" |
|-
| 
! scope="row" | 
| Island of Usedom
|-
| style="background:#b0e0e6;" | 
! scope="row" style="background:#b0e0e6;" | Szczecin Lagoon
| style="background:#b0e0e6;" |
|-
| 
! scope="row" | 
| Mecklenburg-Vorpommern, Brandenburg, Saxony
|-
| 
! scope="row" | 
|
|-
| 
! scope="row" | 
|
|-
| 
! scope="row" | 
|
|-
| 
! scope="row" | 
| Istria
|-
| style="background:#b0e0e6;" | 
! scope="row" style="background:#b0e0e6;" | Adriatic Sea
| style="background:#b0e0e6;" |
|-
| 
! scope="row" | 
| Mainland and the island of Procida
|-
| style="background:#b0e0e6;" | 
! scope="row" style="background:#b0e0e6;" | Mediterranean Sea
| style="background:#b0e0e6;" | Tyrrhenian Sea
|-
| 
! scope="row" | 
| Island of Sicily
|-valign="top"
| style="background:#b0e0e6;" | 
! scope="row" style="background:#b0e0e6;" | Mediterranean Sea
| style="background:#b0e0e6;" | Passing just west of the island of Gozo, 
|-
| 
! scope="row" | 
|
|-
| 
! scope="row" | 
|
|-
| 
! scope="row" | 
| The border with Nigeria is in Lake Chad
|-
| 
! scope="row" | 
|
|-
| 
! scope="row" | 
|
|-
| 
! scope="row" | 
|
|-
| 
! scope="row" | 
|
|-
| 
! scope="row" | 
|
|-
| 
! scope="row" | 
|
|-
| 
! scope="row" | 
|
|-
| 
! scope="row" | 
|
|-
| 
! scope="row" | 
|
|-
| 
! scope="row" | 
|
|-
| style="background:#b0e0e6;" | 
! scope="row" style="background:#b0e0e6;" | Atlantic Ocean
| style="background:#b0e0e6;" |
|-
| style="background:#b0e0e6;" | 
! scope="row" style="background:#b0e0e6;" | Southern Ocean
| style="background:#b0e0e6;" |
|-
| 
! scope="row" | Antarctica
| Queen Maud Land, claimed by 
|}

See also
13th meridian east
15th meridian east

e014th meridian east